Randall Morris (born April 22, 1961, in Anniston, Alabama) is a former American football running back who played 64 games over 5 seasons in the National Football League with two teams.

References 

1961 births
American football running backs
Seattle Seahawks players
Detroit Lions players
Tennessee Volunteers football players
Living people